Joghol may refer to:
 Joghol-e Olya
 Joghol-e Sofla